Reinhold Bötzel (born 8 December 1975) is a paralympic athlete from Germany competing mainly in category F46 high jump and long jump events.

Biography
Despite competing in the high jump and long jump events at both the 2000 and 2004 Summer Paralympics it was as part of the German 4 × 100 m rely team in the T46 class in 2000 that Reinhold won his only Paralympic medal, a bronze.

References

External links
 
 
 

1975 births
Living people
German male high jumpers
German male sprinters
High jumpers with limb difference
Sprinters with limb difference
Paralympic high jumpers
Paralympic sprinters
Paralympic athletes of Germany
Paralympic bronze medalists for Germany
Paralympic medalists in athletics (track and field)
Athletes (track and field) at the 2000 Summer Paralympics
Athletes (track and field) at the 2004 Summer Paralympics
Athletes (track and field) at the 2008 Summer Paralympics
Medalists at the 2000 Summer Paralympics
Medalists at the World Para Athletics European Championships
21st-century German people